Pak Dong-geun (born 27 November 1944) is a North Korean weightlifter. He competed in the men's flyweight event at the 1972 Summer Olympics.

References

1944 births
Living people
North Korean male weightlifters
Olympic weightlifters of North Korea
Weightlifters at the 1972 Summer Olympics
Place of birth missing (living people)
Asian Games medalists in weightlifting
Asian Games silver medalists for North Korea
Weightlifters at the 1974 Asian Games
Medalists at the 1974 Asian Games
20th-century North Korean people
21st-century North Korean people